Oscar "Oca" Inocentes (September 16, 1931 – February 3, 2017) was a Filipino politician who was chairman of the Metropolitan Manila Development Authority of the Republic of the Philippines.

References

2017 deaths
Chairpersons of the Metropolitan Manila Development Authority
Arroyo administration personnel
1931 births